Carinomidae is a family of worms belonging to the order Palaeonemertea.

Genera:
 Carinoma Oudemans, 1885
 Carinomella Coe, 1905
 Statolitonemertes Korotkevich, 1982

References

Palaeonemertea
Nemertea families